Crataegus marshallii is a species of hawthorn known by the common name parsley hawthorn. It is native to the southeastern United States.

The leaves of C. marshallii are finely dissected and decorative. The dainty flowers, small red fruit, and beautiful bark add to the ornamental value of this species.

In 1803, Michaux published the name Crataegus apiifolia for this American species, but that name is considered illegitimate.

References

Bibliography

External links
 ''Parsley Hawthorn, Crataegus marshallii Eggleston" (Floyd County, Northwest Georgia, Southeastern United States)

marshallii
Flora of North America
Plants described in 1785